Taupō, sometimes written Taupo, is a town on the north-eastern shore of Lake Taupō, New Zealand's largest lake,  in the central North Island. It is the largest urban area of the Taupō District, and the second-largest urban area in the Waikato region, behind Hamilton. It has a population of  Taupō was constituted as a borough in 1953. It has been the seat of Taupō District Council since the council was formed in 1989.

Naming
The name Taupō is from the Māori language and is a shortened version of Taupō-nui-a-Tia. The longer name was first given to the cliff at Pākā Bay, on the eastern shore of the lake, and means the "great cloak of Tia". It was named for Tia, the Māori explorer who discovered the lake. Māori later applied the name to the lake itself. In 2019 the official name of the town was changed from Taupo to Taupō.

Although the English pronunciation "tow-po" (NZE ) is widespread, it is often regarded as incorrect, and the Māori pronunciation, "toe-paw" (NZE ), is generally preferred in formal use.

Geographical features 
Taupō is located on the northeastern shore of Lake Taupō, New Zealand's largest lake, which is itself in the caldera of the Taupō Volcano. The Waikato River drains the lake and runs through the town, separating the CBD and the northern suburbs. The river flows over the spectacular Huka Falls, a short distance north of the town, Taupō is a centre of volcanic and geothermal activity, and hot springs suitable for bathing are located at several places in the vicinity. The volcanic Mount Tauhara lies six kilometres (4 mi) to the east.

Somewhat to the northeast are significant hot springs. These springs contain extremophile micro-organisms that live in extremely hot environments.

The small but growing satellite town of Kinloch, where there is a golf course designed by Jack Nicklaus, is 20 kilometres west along the lake.

Suburbs
Taupō suburbs include:

Wharewaka – has a popular swimming spot for locals and a growing new subdivision along with a large retirement village.
Nukuhau – lies north of the Waikato River. To the south-west lies Acacia Bay and to the south lies Taupō town centre.
Richmond Heights – lies to the east of Rainbow Point and south of Mountain View. It is home to the Richmond Heights shopping center.
Waipahihi – lies to the north of Richmond Heights. It is home to the Waipahihi Primary School, and the Waipahihi Botanical Gardens.
Mount View
Acacia Bay
Rainbow Point – lies north of Wharewaka and west of Richmond Heights. To the west lies Lake Taupō.
Tauhara – lies just north of Hilltop and east of Mount View. Mount Tauhara lies just east of Tauhara. Tauhara is the location of Tauhara primary school, Tauhara College and Tauhara Golf course.
Hilltop – lies south of Tauhara. Hilltop is the location of Hilltop School, Taupo Intermediate School, Taupo Hospital, Taharepa shopping centre and Hilltop shopping centre.
Taupo CBD

Outer suburbs
Five Mile Bay – is located on the east side of Lake Taupō, south of Wharewaka and north of Waitahanui on State Highway 1 just west of the Taupo Airport. It is a popular swimming/water skiing beach that is very busy in summer. Five Mile Bay is one of three similar named bays along the lake shoreline, the others being Two Mile Bay and Three Mile Bay.
Wairakei
Waitahanui

Climate

The climate of Taupō is cold and windy when compared to other parts of the North Island and has an oceanic climate (Cfb). This is due to the town being located inland, which results in the accumulation of dry air causing severe frost during winter. However snowfall in Taupō is rare. The summer climate in Taupō is mild with maximum average temperature reaching 23 degrees and a minimum average temperature of 10 degrees.

Demographics 
It is the 26th-largest urban area in New Zealand, and the second-largest in the Waikato Region behind Hamilton.

The Taupō urban area had a population of 23,631 at the 2018 New Zealand census, an increase of 2,508 people (11.9%) since the 2013 census, and an increase of 2,937 people (14.2%) since the 2006 census. There were 9,000 households, comprising 11,520 males and 12,096 females, giving a sex ratio of 0.95 males per female, with 4,740 people (20.1%) aged under 15 years, 3,849 (16.3%) aged 15 to 29, 10,164 (43.0%) aged 30 to 64, and 4,875 (20.6%) aged 65 or older.

Ethnicities were 79.8% European/Pākehā, 24.5% Māori, 3.3% Pacific peoples, 5.7% Asian, and 2.0% other ethnicities. People may identify with more than one ethnicity.

The percentage of people born overseas was 18.5, compared with 27.1% nationally.

Although some people chose not to answer the census's question about religious affiliation, 51.7% had no religion, 34.9% were Christian, 2.7% had Māori religious beliefs, 1.1% were Hindu, 0.2% were Muslim, 0.6% were Buddhist and 1.9% had other religions.

Of those at least 15 years old, 2,991 (15.8%) people had a bachelor's or higher degree, and 3,510 (18.6%) people had no formal qualifications. 2,835 people (15.0%) earned over $70,000 compared to 17.2% nationally. The employment status of those at least 15 was that 9,246 (48.9%) people were employed full-time, 3,003 (15.9%) were part-time, and 507 (2.7%) were unemployed.

Economy

Taupō is a tourist centre, particularly in the summer, as it offers panoramic views over the lake and to the volcanic mountains of Tongariro National Park to the south. It offers a number of tourist activities including sky diving, jet boating, paragliding, and bungy jumping.

Taupō services a number of surrounding plantation pine forests including the large Kaingaroa Forest and related industry. A large sawmill is sited approximated 3 km to the north east of the town on Centennial Drive.

Taupō is surrounded by seven geothermal power stations including the historic Wairakei geothermal power station a few kilometres north of the town.

Sporting events
Regular sporting events in Taupō include Ironman New Zealand, the Lake Taupō Cycle Challenge and the Great Lake Relay (established in 1995). The Lake Taupō Cycle Challenge has about 5,000 riders. The Oxfam Trailwalker has been held in Taupō several times. In 2006 Taupō was also the location of the off-road motorcycle event FIM International Six Day Enduro.

The International Mountain Bicycling Association has designated the mountain biking trails at Bike Taupō as a silver-level IMBA Ride Center. Ride Centers are the IMBA's strongest endorsement of a trail experience.

Education

Taupō has four high schools: Tauhara College, Taupo-nui-a-Tia College, Māori immersion Te Kura Kaupapa Maori o Whakarewa i Te Reo ki Tuwharetoa and state integrated Lake Taupo Christian School. It also has Wairakei, St Patrick's, Waipahihi, Hilltop, Mount View, Taupō and Tauhara primary schools, and Taupo Intermediate School.

Infrastructure and services

Transport
Taupō is served by State Highway 1 and State Highway 5, and is on the Thermal Explorer Highway touring route. All three highways run concurrently along the Eastern Taupō Arterial, which was built in 2010.

Taupō is one of the few large towns in New Zealand that have never had a link to the national rail network, although there have been proposals in the past.

Taupo Airport is located south of the township. Scheduled services to Auckland and Wellington operate from the airport.

Utilities 
Taupō first received a public electricity supply in 1952, with the commissioning of the Hinemaiaia A hydroelectric power station south of the town. The town was connected to the national grid in 1958, coinciding with the commissioning of Wairakei geothermal power station north of the town. Today, Unison Networks owns and operates the electricity distribution network in Taupō.

Natural gas arrived in Taupō in 1987. First Gas operates the gas distribution network in the town.

Taupō's fresh water supply is drawn from Lake Taupō. Prior to 2013, there were two separate fresh water systems serving the town: the Lake Terrace system serving the town north of Napier Road, and the Rainbow Point system serving the southern suburbs. In 2013, the Lake Terrace treatment plant was upgraded and the two systems were amalgamated. Acacia Bay has its own dedicated fresh water system.

Notable people
 Patrick Bevin (born 1991), road racing cyclist
 Bevan Docherty (born 1977), Olympic triathlete
 Sir Tumu Te Heuheu Tukino VIII, Maori Paramount Chief
 James Tito actor and musician
 Nicole van der Kaay (born 1996) Olympic triathlete
 Louisa Wall (born 1972), member of parliament and former national representative netball and rugby union player

Twin cities
Taupō is twinned with:

  Hakone, Japan
  Kulim, Malaysia
  Nouméa, New Caledonia
  Suzhou, China
  Xi'an, China

See also
 Owen Delany Park
 Taupō railway proposals

References

External links

  Regional Tourism Organisation for the Taupo district

Populated places in Waikato
Taupō District
Populated places on the Waikato River
Populated places on Lake Taupō